Ten Pound Poms is an upcoming British historical drama television series created by Danny Brocklehurst for BBC and Stan. The series stars Michelle Keegan, Faye Marsay and Warren Brown as British citizens who migrated to Australia after the Second World War. The series is set to premiere in 2023 and run for six episodes.

Premise 
The story follows a group of Brits, often then colloquially known as Poms in Australia and New Zealand, departing post-war Britain in 1956 for Australia, having been promised a better house, better job prospects and a better quality of life for just £10. However, the group soon learn life in Australia isn't as promised.

Struggling with their new identity as immigrants, we follow their triumphs and pitfalls as they adapt to a new life in a new country far from Britain and familiarity.

Cast 
 Michelle Keegan as Kate
 Faye Marsay as Annie
 Warren Brown as Terry
 Hattie Hook as Pattie
 Finn Treacy as Peter
 Stephen Curry as JJ Walker
 David Field as Dean

Production 
The BBC and Stan first announced the co-commissioning of the drama series, to be produced by British production company Eleven, in May 2022  and the cast were confirmed in June 2022.
The series began filming in Australia in May 2022, taking place primarily in Scheyville National Park and Carcoar, with additional scenes in Sydney.

References

External links 
 

2023 British television series debuts
2020s British drama television series
Historical television series
Television shows filmed in Australia
Television shows set in Australia
BBC television dramas
Stan (service) original programming
Television series by Sony Pictures Television
English-language television shows